Christopher A. Cohen is an American producer, stage manager and director.

As a producer, Chris helmed two "Great Performances"; Broadway's Lost Treasures II (2004) and Broadway's Lost Treasures (2003) for television. Chris also produced many home videos including
Treehouse Trolls Birthday Day, Treehouse Trolls Forest of Fun and Wonder and exercise DVDs including Total Stretch! with Lawrence Leritz,  "Cindy Crawford Shape Your Body" and Richard Simmons.  Mr. Cohen also directed 3 episodes of TV's "Great Performances"; Broadway's Lost Treasures III: The Best of the Tony Awards, Broadway's Lost Treasures II and  Broadway's Lost Treasures.  Chris stage managed the Broadway productions of La Tragedie de Carmen, 84 Charing Cross Road, A Day in Hollywood / A Night in the Ukraine and I Remember Mama and for many years of the Tony Awards.  Chris is the son of Broadway producers Alexander H. Cohen and Hildy Parks.

References

Chris Cohen: https://www.imdb.com/name/nm0169280/  Internet Movie Database
Christopher Cohen: http://www.ibdb.com/person.php?id=90249  Internet Broadway Database

American theatre managers and producers
Living people
Year of birth missing (living people)